Two destroyers of the Imperial Japanese Navy were named Yayoi:

 , a  launched in 1905 and scuttled in 1926
 , a  launched in 1925 and sunk in 1942

Imperial Japanese Navy ship names
Japanese Navy ship names